Greg Michael Foisie (born November 20, 1979) is a former American soccer player who played one season with Seattle Sounders in the USL A-League.

References

External links
Washington Huskies bio

1979 births
Living people
American soccer players
Washington Huskies men's soccer players
Seattle Sounders Select players
Seattle Sounders (1994–2008) players
Association football forwards
Soccer players from Florida
USL League Two players
A-League (1995–2004) players